Paatenemheb ("the Aten [is] in festival") was an ancient Egyptian official who served under pharaohs Amenhotep III and Akhenaten of the 18th Dynasty.

Biography

Son of a man named Ptahmay, Paatenemheb made his way into the ranks of the military to become commander-in-chief of Akhenaten’s army.

His tomb is among those of the nobles in Amarna (TA24). It was barely started, and even the descending stairs were roughly hewn. The few inscriptions from the entrance are no longer visible, but these were recorded at the time of the discovery and reported the titles he had in life: Royal Scribe, Overseer of the soldiery of the Lord of the Two Lands, Steward of the Lord of the Two Lands, and Overseer of porters in Akhetaten.

Identification with Horemheb
It is still uncertain if Paatenemheb was no other than pharaoh Horemheb in his early career — before adopting a name more appropriate to the post-Amarnan religious restoration — or if they were two separate individuals.

Such equation is seen as possible by Aidan Dodson and Dyan Hilton. Toby Wilkinson even contemplates the chance that Paatenhemeb may have switched his name twice: born as Horemheb ("Horus [is] in festival"), changed to Paatenemheb during Akhenaten’s reign, and conveniently reverted to Horemheb after the pharaoh’s death. Conversely, Nicolas Grimal argued that the two apparently were two different persons.

References

See also 
 Tomb of Horemheb in Saqqara

Officials of the Eighteenth Dynasty of Egypt
14th-century BC Egyptian people
Ancient Egyptian scribes
Ancient Egyptian soldiers